Tambaram police commissionerate is a city police administration for southern suburbs of Chennai. It was created by the trifurcation of the Greater Chennai City Police jurisdictions. Tamil Nadu State government created commissionerates for Tambaram and Avadi in an attempt of reforming Greater Chennai Police. Tambaram police commissionerate was formally inaugurated by Chief Minister M. K. Stalin on 1 January 2022. The Tambaram police commissionerate jurisdiction covers 20 police stations from the police districts of Tambaram and Pallikaranai.

References 

Government of Chennai
Metropolitan law enforcement agencies of India